Lukhsky District is an administrative and municipal district (raion), one of the twenty-one in  Ivanovo Oblast, Russia. It is located in the east of the oblast. Its administrative center is the urban locality (a settlement) of Lukh. Population:   10,014 (2002 Census);  The population of Lukh accounts for 33.5% of the district's total population.

References

Notes

Sources

Districts of Ivanovo Oblast